El Rosario National Park is located in El Petén, Guatemala, on the eastern edge of the town of Sayaxché.. The park is named after laguna El Rosario, a small lake within its boundaries, and was formerly a state owned finca managed by the National Forestry Institute (INAB). In 1980 it was declared a national park. The park covers an area of 11.05 km2, including the El Rosario lake, which has a surface area of 4 ha in the dry season, though it is considerably larger during the rainy season.

References

National parks of Guatemala
Protected areas established in 1980
Petén Department
Petén–Veracruz moist forests